The 1997 Road Wild was the second Road Wild professional wrestling pay-per-view (PPV) event produced by World Championship Wrestling (WCW) and the first to be produced under the Road Wild name. It took place on August 9, 1997 from the Sturgis Motorcycle Rally in Sturgis, South Dakota.

In the main event, Hollywood Hogan defeated Lex Luger to win the WCW World Heavyweight Championship, which marked for the second straight year that Hogan won the title at the event. In other important matches on the undercard, The Outsiders retained the World Tag Team Championship against The Steiner Brothers, Curt Hennig defeated Diamond Dallas Page and Ric Flair defeated Syxx.

Storylines
The event featured wrestlers from pre-existing scripted feuds and storylines. Wrestlers portrayed villains, heroes, or less distinguishable characters in the scripted events that built tension and culminated in a wrestling match or series of matches.

Reception
Jack Bramma of 411mania rated the event 4 out of 10 stars and rated it a poor event, stating "It's hard not to feel like the entire show is an afterthought and a waste of time to everyone involved. Not one match other than Rey/Konnan manages to be even competently executed and that one is a bit of a drag because it's all psychology instead of lucha flips in the one place it would make sense. Instead, it's just every name on the roster going through the motions and the booking actively [submarining] Lex as a marquee guy. The "spectacle" of the outdoor show is worth a look, I guess, but nothing is really good or even epically bad to justify hate watching. Take a pass."

Results

Benoit/McMichael vs. Jarrett/Malenko eliminations

References

Road Wild
1997 in South Dakota
Events in South Dakota
Professional wrestling in Sturgis, South Dakota
August 1997 events in the United States
1997 World Championship Wrestling pay-per-view events